Album of Dinosaurs is a 1972 dinosaur book written by Tom McGowen and illustrated by Rod Ruth.

First published by Rand McNally & Company. It was first published in Spanish in 1985 and second published in 1987 by Fernández Editores, México, DF, translated by Jorge Blanco y Correa under the name: El Gran Libro de Dinosaurios.

The book contains a chapter on dinosaurs in general, as well as individual chapters on Coelophysis, Apatosaurus, Stegosaurus, Allosaurus, Iguanodon, Compsognathus, Anatosaurus, Protoceratops, Triceratops, Tyrannosaurus, Ankylosaurus, and Struthiomimus.

Dinosaur books
1972 books